Innes Cameron (born 22 August 2000) is a Scottish professional footballer who plays as a striker for Kilmarnock. Cameron has also played for Stranraer, Ayr United, Alloa Athletic and Queen of the South in various loan spells.

Club career
Cameron started his senior career with Kilmarnock in the 2016–17 season. In September 2018, Cameron was loaned out to Stranraer alongside Daniel Higgins and scored on his debut.

In October 2020, Cameron was then loaned out to Ayr United. In January 2021, Cameron was then loaned out to Alloa Athletic until 31 May 2021.

On 30 September 2021, Cameron was loaned out to Queen of the South. On 13 January 2022, Cameron was recalled by Kilmarnock's new manager Derek McInnes, due to the club having injuries to several key players. On 31 January 2022, Cameron returned to Queen of the South on loan for the rest of the 2021–22 season.

International career
Cameron has represented Scotland at under-17 level.

Career statistics

References

2000 births
Living people
Scottish footballers
Kilmarnock F.C. players
Stranraer F.C. players
Ayr United F.C. players
Alloa Athletic F.C. players
Queen of the South F.C. players
Scottish Professional Football League players
Association football forwards
Scotland youth international footballers